The Stu Sells Cookstown Classic, formerly the CookstownCash presented by Comco Canada Inc. is an annual curling tournament that was part of the World Curling Tour, the highest-level curling tour in the world. The event was introduced in 2012 and was held on the first weekend in November, at the Cookstown Curling Club in Cookstown, Ontario. Originally just part of the Ontario Curling Tour, it was part of the World Curling Tour from 2014 to 2017. After a five-year pause, the event returned in 2022 as part of the Stu Sells series.

Team Alex Champ of Kitchener–Waterloo were the most recent men's champions in 2022. Team Heather Heggestad was the last women's team to win the event, in 2016.

Past champions

Men

Women

References

External links

Ontario Curling Tour events
Sport in Simcoe County
Former World Curling Tour events